Camborne was a county constituency in Cornwall which returned one Member of Parliament to the House of Commons of the Parliament of the United Kingdom. It was created for the 1885 general election, and abolished for the 1950 general election, when it was largely replaced by the new Falmouth and Camborne.

Between 1885 and 1918 its official name was The North West or Camborne Division of Cornwall, and it was sometimes referred to simply as North West Cornwall.

Boundaries 
1885–1918: Part of the Sessional Division of Penwith East, and the civil parishes of Gwennap and St Agnes.

1918–1950: The Borough of Helston, the Urban Districts of Camborne, Hayle, Phillack, and Redruth, the Rural District of Redruth, in the Rural District of East Kerrier the parishes of Constantine, Mabe, and Perranarworthal, in the Rural District of Helston the parishes of Crowan and Wendron, and in the Rural District of Truro the parishes of Kea, Kenwyn Rural, Perranzabuloe, St Agnes, St Allen, and Tregavethan.

Members of Parliament

Elections

Elections in the 1880s

Elections in the 1890s

Elections in the 1900s

Elections in the 1910s 

General Election 1914–15:

Another General Election was required to take place before the end of 1915. The political parties had been making preparations for an election to take place and by the July 1914, the following candidates had been selected; 
Liberal: Rt Hon. Francis Dyke Acland
Unionist: 

 No Coupon was issued

Elections in the 1920s 

 The local Liberal Association was unable to agree on a candidate, but Moreing was recognised as the official candidate by Liberal Party HQ.

Elections in the 1930s

Elections in the 1940s 
General Election 1939–40:
Another General Election was required to take place before the end of 1940. The political parties had been making preparations for an election to take place from 1939 and by the end of this year, the following candidates had been selected; 
Conservative:  Peter Agnew 
Liberal:
Labour: J J H Moses

See also

Camborne and Redruth (UK Parliament constituency)
Falmouth and Camborne (UK Parliament constituency)

References 

Parliamentary constituencies in Cornwall (historic)
Constituencies of the Parliament of the United Kingdom established in 1885
Constituencies of the Parliament of the United Kingdom disestablished in 1950
Camborne